Sree Sevugan Annamalai College, is a general degree college located in Devakottai, Sivagangai district, Tamil Nadu. It was established in the year 1970. The college is affiliated with Alagappa University. This college offers different courses in arts, commerce and science.

Departments

Science
Physics
Chemistry
Mathematics
Zoology
Computer Science
computer science(evening)

Arts and Commerce
Tamil
English
Economics
Business Administration
Commerce

Accreditation
The college is  recognized by the University Grants Commission (UGC).

References

External links

Educational institutions established in 1970
1970 establishments in Tamil Nadu
Colleges affiliated to Alagappa University